Carollo may refer to:

Agostino Carollo (Spankox), Italian musician, disc jockey, singer and producer
Anthony Carollo (1923–2007), American mobster, boss of the New Orleans crime family, son of the mob boss Silvestro Carollo
Bill Carollo (born 1951), retired American football official
C. Marcella Carollo, professional astronomer from 1994 to 2019
Charles "Charley The Wop" Carollo (1902–1979), Italian-born Kansas City, Missouri crime boss during the 1930s
Giorgio Carollo (born 1944), Italian politician
Joe Carollo (born 1955), Cuban-American politician, mayor of Miami 1996–1997 and 1998–2001
Joe Carollo (American football) (born 1940), former American football offensive tackle
Russell Carollo (1955–2018), American Pulitzer prize-winning journalist
Sante Carollo (1924–2004), Italian road cyclist
Silvestro Carollo (1896–1970), nicknamed "Silver Dollar Sam", Italian-American mob boss, boss of the New Orleans crime family
Vincenzo Carollo (1920–2013), Italian politician from Palermo and member of the Christian Democratic Party (DC)

See also

Carolle
Carollo engineers, environmental engineering firm specializing in water and wastewater facilities for municipal and public sector clients in the United States
Caracollo
Cariello
Corallo
Curillo